Lucille Lemay (born 20 July 1950) is a Canadian archer.

Lemay competed at the 1976 Summer Olympics, where she finished 5th in the individual event, and at the 1984 Summer Olympics, where she finished 33rd in the individual event.

She won a bronze medal at the 1982 Commonwealth Games in the individual event.

References

1950 births
Living people
Olympic archers of Canada
Archers at the 1976 Summer Olympics
Archers at the 1984 Summer Olympics
Archers at the 1982 Commonwealth Games
Canadian female archers
Commonwealth Games bronze medallists for Canada
Commonwealth Games medallists in archery
Pan American Games medalists in archery
Pan American Games silver medalists for Canada
Archers at the 1983 Pan American Games
Medalists at the 1983 Pan American Games
Medallists at the 1982 Commonwealth Games